This is a list of notable multi-channel networks. Multi-channel networks (MCNs) are organizations that work with video platforms such as YouTube to offer assistance in areas such as "product, programming, funding, cross-promotion, partner management, digital rights management, monetization/sales, and/or audience development", usually in exchange for a percentage of the AdSense revenue from the channel.

Based in Asia 

 Adober Studios formerly Chicken Pork Adobo (Philippines)
 afreecaTV (South Korea)
 Diwan Videos (Dubai, UAE)
 Hololive Production (Japan)
 Nijisanji (Japan)
 TV Derana (Sri Lanka)
 Uturn Entertainment (Saudi Arabia)
 UUUM (Japan)
 WebTVAsia (Malaysia)
 Xiaowu Brothers 小五科技 (China)

Based in Australia 

Valleyarm

Based in the EU 

 Digital Minds (Greece)
 HashtagNetwork (Netherlands)
 Mediakraft Networks (Germany)
 Studio71 (Germany)
 Zoomin.TV (Netherlands)
 Videostars (Lithuania)
 Mediacube (Cyprus)

Based in North America

 Above Average Productions (Broadway Video)
 Alloy Entertainment (Warner Bros. Discovery)
 AwesomenessTV (Paramount Global)
 BroadbandTV Corp (Bertelsmann)
 Channel Frederator Network (Wow Unlimited Media)
 Curse: Union for Gamers (Amazon)
 Disney Digital Network (Formerly Maker Studios)
 Discovery Digital Networks (Warner Bros. Discovery)
 Fullscreen (Warner Bros. Discovery) (Went defunct in 2021)
 The Game Theorists
 JETPAK
 Jukin Media
 Kin Community
 My Damn Channel 
 NormalBoots Inc.
 OfflineTV
 Omnia Media (Enthusiast Gaming)
 ONErpm (Amazon)
 Rooster Teeth (Warner Bros. Discovery)
 Style Haul (Bertelsmann)
 Symphonic Distribution
 TYT Network
 Vevo (Universal / Sony)
 VShojo
 Yoola
 Warner Music Group

Based in the UK 

 Brave Bison
 BuzzMyVideos
 ChannelFlip (Banijay)
 Diagonal View (Comcast)
 WildBrain Spark (WildBrain)
 The Yogscast

See also
 Cost per mille
 Cost per impression

References 

Multi-channel networks